Sachsenhagen is a town in the district of Schaumburg, in Lower Saxony, Germany. It is situated approximately 9 km northeast of Stadthagen, and 33 km west of Hanover.

Sachsenhagen is also the seat of the Samtgemeinde ("collective municipality") Sachsenhagen.

References

Towns in Lower Saxony
Schaumburg